Saw Omma was a queen consort of King Swa Saw Ke of Ava. She was a granddaughter of King Saw Yun, the founder of Sagaing Kingdom, and a sister of King Thado Minbya, the founder of Ava Kingdom. When Swa became king, Omma was first given the title of Queen of the Middle Palace and Sagaing in fief. When her elder sister Shin Saw Gyi became the chief queen, Omma succeeded her sister as the Queen of the Northern Palace.

Ancestry
The following is her ancestry according to Hmannan. She was descended from Pagan and Pinya royalty. Her paternal side is unreported except that her father was of the Tagaung royal line.

Notes

References

Bibliography
 
 

Queens consort of Ava
14th-century Burmese women